Edward John Amoore (20 March 1877 – 11 July 1955) was a British sport shooter and road cyclist who competed at the 1908 Summer Olympics as a shooter.

In 1903 he won fastest time at the annual Anfield B.C. Invitational 100 mile time trial. In the 1908 Olympics he won a gold medal in the team small-bore rifle event, bronze in the disappearing target small-bore rifle event, was fifth in the stationary target small-bore rifle event and 19th in the moving target small-bore rifle event. He went on to serve in the First World War as an officer in the Honourable Artillery Company becoming its Adjutant.

References

External links
profile
London Gazette

1877 births
1955 deaths
British male sport shooters
ISSF rifle shooters
Olympic shooters of Great Britain
Shooters at the 1908 Summer Olympics
Olympic gold medallists for Great Britain
Olympic bronze medallists for Great Britain
Olympic medalists in shooting
Medalists at the 1908 Summer Olympics
British Army personnel of World War I